The Incognito Lounge and Other Poems is a collection of lyric poetry by Denis Johnson. Published in 1982 by Random House, the volume was Johnson's fourth book of poems.

The volume was selected by Mark Strand for the National Poetry Series in 1982.

Poems

Critical appraisal
John Casteen, writing in Voltage Poetry ranks The Incognito Lounge and Other Poems as one of Johnson's two literary "masterpieces", the other his short fiction volume Jesus' Son (1992). Nicholo Niarchos in The New Yorker, while acknowledging Johnson's fine prose, considers it "a shame that the author is not more known for his verse":

Alan Williamson of The New York Times writes: "Johnson convinces me that he suffers over the anomie he describes. He is hard on himself, as well as on the culture; and he is agonizingly aware that life can be, and has been, different from the life around him." Williamson praises "Passengers", one of the sonnets in the volume. Poet Ray Deshpande of the Poetry Foundation notes that while Johnson was "adept across genres, writing plays and searing war reportage in addition to fiction, one finds a distinctive voice in his four short books of poems." Among the poets influenced by Johnson are Bianca Stone, Matt Hart, and Lucie Brock-Broido. Deshpande quotes poet Jorie Graham: "Lord knows, I couldn't have written without Denis Johnson's The Incognito Lounge..."

Poet Richard Miklitsch writing in The Iowa Review considers the title poem "The Incognito Lounge" the "premiere" work in the volume, one that "twists tradition in such a way as to seem wholly independent of it." Miklitsch adds: "Johnson's imagination seems particularly suited to this kind of poem, one composed of seemingly self-contained anecdotes that, put together, produced a skewed but strangely satisfying story." Miklitsch regards a number of the poems in the collection as technically "unfinished", in particular "From a Berkeley Notebook":

Among those poems in the volume that succeed in making "the ordinary extraordinary" Miklitsch cites "Heat", "Enough", "At the Olympic Peninsula", "Ten Months After Turning Thirty" and "The Flames."
In the verse that forms "The Circus" Miklitsch locates Johnson's "poetic personality":

Footnotes

Sources 

 
 
 
 
 
 

1982 poetry books
American poetry collections
Books by Denis Johnson
Poetry by Denis Johnson
Random House books